Fate/Grand Order - Absolute Demonic Front: Babylonia is a Japanese anime television series based on the seventh chapter of the game of the same name. It premiered on October 5, 2019 to March 21, 2020. Aniplex of America licensed the series in North America, and is streaming the series on FunimationNow streaming service, with AnimeLab streaming the series in Australia and New Zealand. The series is listed for 21 episodes.

Unison Square Garden performed the series' opening theme song "Phantom Joke". Eir Aoi performed the series' first ending theme song  while milet performed the series' second ending theme song "Prover" and the third ending song "Tell me".

Episode list

Notes

References

Lists of Fate/stay night episodes
Fate Grand Order - Absolute Demonic Front: Babylonia